Mohammed Sulemana (born 13 December 2002) is a Ghanaian professional footballer who currently plays as a winger for Ghana Premier League side Dreams FC and the Ghana national under-20 football team.

Career 
Mohammed Sulemana began his professional career as a youth team player for Reform F.C at Koforidua in Ghana before moving on to Bazuka F.C in Nsawam, Ghana also as a youth team player, and subsequently became a first team player for Dreams F.C in 2019. Mohammed Sulemana then got a call-up the Ghana national under-20 football team in 2020. 

Sulemana played the full 90 minutes in 3–0 win against West African Football Academy on 3 February 2021.

References 

Living people
2002 births
Ghanaian footballers
Ghana Premier League players
Association football forwards
Ghana youth international footballers
Dreams F.C. (Ghana) players